Call of the Bush is a 1912 Australian silent film. It is considered a lost film.

Plot
The film was billed as "a story of the Australian bush, based on the incidents of the easy miner settlements."

The home of Wm Collins, a squatter on the Lachlan, was shown, together with the return Fred, who had won his V.C. in the recent Boer war. Fred was secretly loved by Mary Campbell, but lost his heart to the shepherd's pretty daughter to whom he presented his dog Ruby. Bill Doyle, a stockman, was also infatuated with this girl and swore that if he could not have her Fred Collins would not. Through Bill's actions, Fred was sent away from home because of his alleged unfaithfulness to Mary Cameron, but was brought back when the latter declared that he had never made love to her. Young Cameron was killed by Doyle on the journey and the latter left Fred's riding whip under the body so that the crime might be fixed upon him. Fred, in due course was arrested and tried, but at this critical moment a sundowner who has witnessed the murder turned up and gave evidence, at the same time producing a handkerchief bearing the name of Doyle. Fred was released and married and married the shepherd's daughter while Doyle went to the scaffold. The sundowner, though offered a home with the happy young couple, could not remains in conventional quarters so responded again to the call of the bush.

It was divided into the following chapters:
the squatter's son
a welcome home
the shepherd's daughter
Bosun, the dog hero
attacked by blacks
the last cartridge
a foul revenge
wrongly accused
a sundowner to the rescue
great court scene.

Production
This was the first film made in Australian by the Gaumont Company, trading as "The Gaumont Agency". Other sources however say it was some the Australian Photoplay Company – who were bought out by Gaumont. Another says it was from "Gaumont Federal Films", an amalgamation of Gaumont and APPC.

The script was written by Jack Allen of Wollongong.

It was shot on location on a New South Wales station.

The Gaumont Agency later also made The Opium Runners.

References

External links

Australian silent short films
1912 films
Lost Australian films
Australian black-and-white films